A floor broker is an independent member of an exchange who can act as a broker for other members who become overloaded with orders, as an agent on the floor of the exchange. The floor broker receives an order via Teletype machine from his firm's trading department and then proceeds to the appropriate trading post on the exchange floor. There he joins other brokers and the specialist in the security being bought or sold and executes the trade at the best competitive price available. On completion of the transaction the customer is notified through his registered representative back at the firm and the trade is printed on the consolidated ticker tape which is displayed electronically around the country. A floor broker should not be confused with a floor trader who trades as a principal for his or her own account, rather than as a broker.
Commission brokers are employees of a member firm.

References

Financial markets
Brokerage firms